Stark or Starke may refer to:

Places

Antarctica and vicinity
 Stark Point, James Ross Island
 Stark Ridge, Churchill Mountains
 Stark Rock, south of the Crulls Islands

United States
 Stark, Georgia, an unincorporated community
 Stark, Illinois, an unincorporated community
 Stark, Kansas, a city
 Stark, Kentucky, an unincorporated community
 Stark, Missouri, an unincorporated community
 Stark, New Hampshire, a town
 Stark, New York, a town
 Stark, West Virginia, an unincorporated community
 Stark, Wisconsin, a town
 Stark City, Missouri
 Stark County, Illinois
 Starke County, Indiana
 Stark County, North Dakota
 Stark County, Ohio
 Stark Township, Brown County, Minnesota
 Starke, Florida, a city

Elsewhere
Stark (crater), on the Moon

People with the name
Stark (surname), including Starke, and fictional characters
Stark Young (1881–1963), American teacher and writer

Arts, entertainment, and media

Fictional entities
 Stark (The Longest Journey), a world in the video game
 Stark, in Michael Marshall Smith's novel Only Forward 
 House Stark, in George R. R. Martin's works
 Tony Stark or Iron Man, a Marvel comic book character

Other uses in arts, entertainment, and media
 Stark (miniseries), based on Ben Elton's novel
 Stark (novel), by Ben Elton
Stark, a 2005 album by Gregory Douglass

Brands and enterprises
 Štark, a food manufacturing company in Belgrade, Serbia
 Stark Brothers Nurseries and Orchards, in northeastern Missouri
 Stark Candy, later acquired by Necco

Properties on the United States National Register of Historic Places
 Stark Building, Waltham, Massachusetts
 Stark Park, Manchester, New Hampshire
 Stark Round Barn, near Unityville, South Dakota
 Starke Round Barn, near Red Cloud, Nebraska

Science and technology
Stark effect, an optical phenomenon in physics
Stark spectroscopy
STARK (cryptography) (Scalable Transparent ARgument of Knowledge), a protocol in cryptography

Other uses 
 Stark, a  barley cultivar
 Stark Law, U.S., restricting physician self-referrals
 Stark Museum of Art, in eastern Texas
 Stark–Heegner theorem, in algebra
 TAC Stark, a Brazilian vehicle
 USS Stark (FFG-31), a former frigate

See also
Starck (disambiguation)
Starkland, a record label
Starks (disambiguation)